The 2022 Judo Grand Slam Tokyo was held at the Tokyo Metropolitan Gymnasium in Tokyo, Japan, from 3 to 4 December 2022 as part of the IJF World Tour and during the 2024 Summer Olympics qualification period.

Medal summary

Medal table

Men's events

Women's events

Source Results

Prize money
The sums written are per medalist, bringing the total prizes awarded to €154,000.

References

External links
 

2022 IJF World Tour
2022 Judo Grand Slam
Judo
Grand Slam, 2022
Judo
Judo
Judo